Daria Guidetti (born 1978) is an Italian astrophysicist linked to the INAF. She studied astronomy at the University of Bologna and is a member of the astronomy club at Montelupo.

The Minor Planet Center credits her with the co-discovery of two asteroids, 34004 Gregorini and 49443 Marcobondi, discovered at the Montelupo Observatory  in 1998 and 2000, in collaboration with Italian astronomers Maura Tombelli and Egisto Masotti, respectively.

At the end of 2016 she made her debut as correspondent at the stadium for the TV show Quelli che il calcio, to follow Empoli Football Club matches.

In 2018 she made her debut as author and presenter of the TV program Destinazione Spazio (Destination Space) on the italian TV station Reteconomy.

In December 2019 she published the volume Campi Magnetici (Magnetic fields) in the series Viaggio nell'Universo (Journey into the universe), published by Corriere della Sera.

References

External links 
 Gruppo Astrofili Montelupo, website (Italian)

21st-century women scientists
Discoverers of asteroids
Italian astrophysicists
Living people
Place of birth missing (living people)
1978 births